Żelazo may refer to:

Żelazo, Łódź Voivodeship, Poland
Żelazo, Pomeranian Voivodeship, Poland